Jakob Čebašek (born April 28, 1991) is a Slovenian professional basketball player who last played for Leuven Bears of the Belgium Pro Basketball League. He is a 2.00 m tall Forward.

Professional career
Čebašek started playing professional basketball for Parklji Ljubljana.

In August 2014, Čebašek signed with Maribor Nova KBM. In February 2015, he parted with Maribor Nova KBM and signed with Elektra Šoštanj for the rest of the season.

On July 23, 2015, he signed a one-year deal with Zlatorog Laško.

In August 2016, Čebašek signed with Hopsi Polzela.

On July 10, 2017, he signed a one-year deal with Belgium club Liège Basket.

On October 15, 2020, he signed a short-term contract with Allianz Pallacanestro Trieste of the Italian Serie A that was having many injuries. Čebašek parted ways with the team on November 9 after appearing in one game.

In March 2021 he moved to Dinamo București in the Romanian Liga Națională. Čebašek debuted in April 1 against CSO Voluntari where he scored 17 points.

On June 30, 2021, he signed a one-year deal with Belgium club Leuven Bears.

International career
Čebašek made his debut for the Slovenian national team on 14 September 2018, at the 2019 FIBA Basketball World Cup qualification game against Latvia.

References

External links
 Eurobasket.com profile

1991 births
Living people
Basketball players at the 2020 Summer Olympics
Kangoeroes Basket Mechelen players
KD Hopsi Polzela players
KK Šentjur players
KK Zlatorog Laško players
Lega Basket Serie A players
Leuven Bears players
Liège Basket players
Olympic basketball players of Slovenia
Pallacanestro Trieste players
Power forwards (basketball)
Shooting guards
Slovenian expatriate basketball people in Italy
Slovenian expatriate sportspeople in Belgium
Slovenian men's basketball players
Small forwards
Basketball players from Ljubljana